Bianouan is a town in south-eastern Ivory Coast. It is a sub-prefecture of Aboisso Department in Sud-Comoé Region, Comoé District.

Bianouan was a commune until March 2012, when it became one of 1126 communes nationwide that were abolished.
In 2021, the population of the sub-prefecture of Bianouan was 49,647.

Villages
The seven villages of the sub-prefecture of Bianouan and their population in 2014 are:
 Appouasso  (5 880)
 Bianouan  (13 547)
 Kétesso  (8 264)
 Kouakoukro  (962)
 Kpélékro  (1 381)
 Songan  (9 988)
 Soubré  (1 421)

References

Sub-prefectures of Sud-Comoé
Former communes of Ivory Coast